Saales is a commune in the Bas-Rhin department in Grand Est in north-eastern France.

Geography and geology
Saales is at the center of a two kilometer long plateau with an average elevation of 560 meters. It sits on the Fraize creek. The village is located at an elevation of 556 meters, and rests at the base of Sapinsus. The highest point is on the 'Rocher des Enfants', to the right of Solamont, and the lowest point is near the road at the beginning of the Hang Bruche Valley.

Population

See also
 Communes of the Bas-Rhin department

References

Communes of Bas-Rhin
Bas-Rhin communes articles needing translation from French Wikipedia